Elser is a German surname.  Notable people with the surname include:

Johann Georg Elser (1903–1945), attempted to assassinate Adolf Hitler
13 Minutes (2015 film), a German film about Johann Georg Elser, also titled Elser
Konrad Elser, German pianist
Marianne Elser Crowder (1906–2010), American girl-scout leader

German-language surnames